Sri Kumaran Children's Home is one of the best schools in Banglore with a sprawling campus of 40 acres.
This school to date has produced many greats like Tejasvi Surya who is the Member of Parliament for South Banglore 

Sri Kumaran Children's Home, Bangalore is a group of institutions in Bangalore, Karnataka, India,.
The institution is over 50 years old and presently has five school campuses.
 Sri Kumaran Children's Home, CBSE, a CBSE school part of the Kumaran Group of Institutions located in Mallasandra, Bangalore and Doddakalsandra , Banglore
 Sri Kumaran Children's Home, ICSE, an ICSE school part of the Kumaran Group of Institutions located in Mallasandra, Bangalore
 Sri Kumaran Children's Home, State, a Karnataka State Board school part of the Kumaran Group of Institutions located in Tata Silk Farm, Bangalore
 Sri Kumaran Children's Home, Nursery, a kindergarten school part of the Kumaran Group of Institutions located near Tata Silk Farm, Bangalore
 Sri Kumaran Children's Home, College, a Pre-University college part of the Kumaran Group of Institutions, located at Padmanabhanagar, Bangalore

References

Schools in Bangalore